Svenska Sällskapet was formed in Minneapolis, Minnesota in 1925 by Nils Leon Jansson, Swedish consul to Minnesota and the NW States and served as president from 1925 to 1931. Membership at that time was limited to 50 men of Swedish birth or descent and of good character, and who have demonstrated sympathy with the aims and purposes with the Society and who will add to the credit of the Society.

History
In the late 1880s through the first quarter of the 20th century, the United States government was eager to attract Swedish immigrants to settle the lands of the upper mid-west. Swede’s were known for their strong work ethic and their forestry and lumber skills, and made ideal recruits for developing the state of Minnesota. Swede’s also had a very high literacy rate, and soon there was a thriving Swedish cultural community in Minnesota with Swedish language newspapers, magazines, entertainers, business leaders, professionals, and government officials. In particular, the American Swedish Institute was founded by Swan Turnblad, a publisher of Swedish language newspapers.

Many fraternal organizations were developed during this period including VASA, Gustav Adolf Society, Svithoid, as well as Svenska Sällskapet. Prior to World War II, the activities of Svenska Sällskapet were regularly reported in the society pages of the major newspapers in Minneapolis and St. Paul. The first meetings were held at the homes of members, starting with Dr. K. Paul Carson, a dentist, and Victor Nelson, a college professor with a Ph.D in languages. Later, the meetings were held in hotel dining rooms. Our by-laws were originally adopted in 1946.

References

Organizations established in 1925
Swedish-American culture in Minneapolis–Saint Paul